C. C. Lang & Son, a Baltimore-based pickle and sauerkraut manufacturing company, was started in 1881. Located in one of the chief canning cities of the United States, the pickle and sauerkraut company supplied their own cucumbers and cabbage from the Lang Farm, located in Glen Arm, Maryland.

Started by German immigrant C.C. Lang, the business was passed down to Charles Gottlieb Lang, (1890–1956) who expanded the small business into an enterprise employing 700 persons in Maryland, Virginia, South Carolina, North Carolina, New  York, Wisconsin, and Michigan.

In the 1940s this pickle and sauerkraut industry was made up of about 300 canning factories located around the country. In addition to C.C. Lang & Son, these companies include the H. J. Heinz Company and Hunt Foods, as well as California Packing Corp, Green Bay Food Company and Libby, McNeill & Libby.

References

Manufacturing companies based in Baltimore
German-American culture in Baltimore
Manufacturing companies established in 1881
Food and drink companies based in Maryland
Food and drink companies established in 1881
American companies established in 1881
1881 establishments in Maryland